Trnovec (or Tiefenreuter) is a settlement in the hills northeast of the town of Kočevje in southern Slovenia. The area is part of the traditional region of Lower Carniola and is now included in the Southeast Slovenia Statistical Region.

Name
Trnovec was attested in historical sources as Tieffenreutter in 1574. After the Second World War, the settlement of Trnovec was administratively combined with Podstenice and shared that name. It was separated again from Podstenice in 1988 and Trnovec was reestablished as a separate settlement.

History
Trnovec was settled by Gottschee Germans in the Middle Ages. It had 17 houses in the early 20th century.

At the start of the Second World War, its original population was evicted.  As part of the Rog Offensive in the summer of 1942, the village was burned by Italian forces. After the Italian surrender in 1943, the Yugoslav Partisans used a site below the village to store ammunition.

Mass graves
Trnovec is the site of three known mass graves associated with the Second World War. The Rog Sawmill Mass Grave is located on the edge of the woods on the left side of Rog Road, at a large pile of sawdust. The remains of unknown victims were found at the site in 1989. It contains the remains of a large number of Home Guard troops and soldiers of other nationalities that were turned over to the Yugoslav authorities after the war and murdered. The Larch Hill Rock Shelter Mass Grave lies on the southwest edge of a shallow sinkhole in the middle of a wooded leveled karstified area southwest of Larch Hill. It contains the remains of one or more unknown victims that probably fled to the rock shelter during the war or during the killing at Larch Hill Cave.

Church
The local church, dedicated to the Virgin Mary, was a late Gothic building that was burned down in 1942 during the Second World War.

References

External links
Trnovec on Geopedia
Pre–World War II list of oeconyms and family names in Trnovec

Populated places in the Municipality of Kočevje